Swami Vivekanand Subharti University is a private university located in Meerut, Uttar Pradesh, India. The university was established in September 2008 and has 14 faculties.

Campus 

The university is situated on a 250-acre campus in Meerut, in the National Capital Region of India. It includes a 1042-bed hospital and an auditorium with 2,500 seating capacity. There are 13 hostels for students and ten residential complexes for faculty members and staff.

Faculties 
The university's academic structure consists of 52 departments beneath the following 14 faculties:

Arts and Social Science (Estd. 2009)
Dental Science (Estd. 1997)
Education (Estd. 2008)
Engineering and Technology (Estd. 2005)
Hotel Management (Estd. 2009)
Journalism and Mass Communication (Estd. 2008)
Law (Estd. 2002)
Library Science (Estd. 2011)
Management and Commerce (Estd. 2008)
Medical (Estd. 2000)
Nursing (Estd. 2000)
Para-Medical Sciences (Estd. 1999)
Pharmacy (Estd. 2009)
Science (Estd. 2012)

Notable alumni 
 Pooja Pal, MLA

External collaboration 
The university has signed Memorandum of Understanding with 25 other universities and organizations.

References

External links
 subharti.org, Official website
 

Private universities in Uttar Pradesh
Universities and colleges in Meerut
Educational institutions established in 2008
2008 establishments in Uttar Pradesh

 distancepathshala.com, Official website